The Gryta Hydroelectric Power Station is a hydroelectric power station in the municipality of Rindal in Trøndelag county, Norway. Permission was granted for construction in 2006 and the plant came into operation in 2009. It is operated by Gryta Kraft AS.

See also

References

Hydroelectric power stations in Norway
Rindal
Energy infrastructure completed in 2009